Fenwick Justin John Lawson, ARCA (born 19 May 1932 in South Moor, County Durham) is an English sculptor based in the north-east of England.

Life
Fenwick Lawson was born in 1932 in South Moor, County Durham, and spent his childhood in the neighbouring village of Craghead.

He studied at the Sunderland College of Art (1951–54) and Royal College of Art, London (1954–57), under John Skeaping and under the influence of Jacob Epstein (then in the college working on the Llandaff Christ).  In 1958 and 1959, having been awarded the Sir James Knott Travelling Scholarship, he completed his studies by travel in France, Italy and Greece, being influenced by the sculptural masters such as Michelangelo and Donatello and by the simplicity of form in Cycladic art.

In 1961, he was appointed lecturer in sculpture at Newcastle-upon-Tyne College of Art and when this merged into Newcastle-upon-Tyne Polytechnic in 1970, he became a principal Lecturer and head of sculpture before retiring from teaching in 1984.

He has been a member of various bodies, such as the Art and Architects Department of the Bishops' Conference of England and Wales (1972–77), the Fabrics Advisory Committee of Newcastle Cathedral (1991–94), and the Advisory Committee for Historic Churches in the Diocese of Hexham and Newcastle (1995–2000).  He was also visiting lecturer at the Duncan of Jordanstone College of Art, Dundee, Scotland (1987) and at the Royal Academy in London (1987–89).  He has been an honorary member of the Northumbria Branch of the Royal Institute of British Architects since 1986, and was a trustee of Durham City Trust from 1979 to 1995.

Lawson has been awarded an honorary Doctor of Letters from Durham University (2008). Durham City's  'The Journey' was unveiled by The Princess Royal on 26 September 2008. Lawson was granted the Freeman of the City of Durham on 10 November 2008.

Some of Fenwick's work
Name, date, and current location.
Coventry Christ, 1955–1956, St Peter's, Jarrow
St Michael and the Devil, 1956, St Paul's, Jarrow
Interaction, 1962, Laing Art Gallery, Newcastle-upon-Tyne
Holy Family, 1967, Church of the Holy Family, Grindon, Sunderland, Tyne and Wear
The Risen Christ, 1968, St Paul's, Jarrow
St Bede, 1970, St Bede's, Washington, Tyne and Wear
Risen Christ, 1972, RC Chaplaincy, Newcastle University
Venerable Bede, 1973, St Paul's, Jarrow
Pieta, 1974–1981, east end of Durham Cathedral since 2004 (shown at York Minster 1984 – 1996)
Cuthbert of Farne, 1984, Durham Heritage Centre (originally shown in the cloister of Durham Cathedral from 1984 to 1996; full-size bronze cast made in 2000 is on show at Lindisfarne Abbey)
Risen Christ, 1974, St Michael's, Houghton-le-Spring
Pulpit Christ, 1976, Southwick Cathedral, London
Lord of the Dance, 1956, St Peter and Paul, Fareham, Hampshire
Annunciation, 1977, St Mary-le-Bow, London
Lectern with Carved Dove, 1978–79, Bill Quay Methodist Church, Pelaw, Tyne and Wear
Processional Cross, 1981, St Pancras Parish Church, Euston Road, London
Processional Cross, 1982, St Gregory's, South Shields, Tyne and Wear
Risen Christ, 1982, St Gregory's, South Shields, Tyne and Wear
Annunciation, 1982, St Gregory's, South Shields, Tyne and Wear
Pascal Candle, 1982, St Gregory's, South Shields, Tyne and Wear
Dove, 1982, St Gregory's, South Shields, Tyne and Wear
Trinity, 1982, Church of the Holy Trinity, Carlisle
Risen Christ, 1983, St Oswald's, South Shields, Tyne and Wear
Condemned, 1984, Ushaw College, Co Durham
Hostage, 1984, Ushaw College, Co Durham
The Scream, 1985, Ushaw College, Co Durham
Christ in the Tomb, 1985, (14th station of the cross, with casts of the hands of the Ascended Christ at Jarrow), 1988, east end of Durham Cathedral
Stations of the Cross, 1986, St Joseph's, Wetherby
Our Lady, 1986, St Joseph's, Wetherby
Risen Christ, 1986, St Joseph's, Wetherby
Stations of the Cross, 1986, Ecumenical Chapel, Youth Custody Centre, Castington, Northumberland
Our Lady, 1986, Ecumenical Chapel, Youth Custody Centre, Castington, Northumberland
Risen Christ, 1988, St Francis of Assisi, Sheffield
Weeping Women, 1989–90, Ushaw College, Co Durham
Celtic Spirit 2, 1990, Teikyo University, Durham City
San Damiano Christ, 1991, Beda Pontifico Collegio, Rome
Pascal Candle, 1991, St Anthony's, Hull
Spiral Floor Mosaic, 1992, The Crypt, Cathedral Church of St Marie, Sheffield
Risen Christ, 1992, The Crypt, Cathedral Church of St Marie, Sheffield
Standing Cross, 1992, St Bede's, Bedlington, Northumberland
Our Lady of Bedlington, 1992, St Bede's, Bedlington, Northumberland
Christ Is the Morning Star, Stained glass window, 1992, St Bede's, Bedlington, Northumberland
Star of David, 1992, St Bede's, Bedlington, Northumberland
Altar, 1993, St Augustine's, Darlington, Co. Durham
Lectern, 1993, St Augustine's, Darlington, Co. Durham
Chair, 1993, St Augustine's, Darlington, Co. Durham
Font, 1993, St Augustine's, Darlington, Co. Durham
St Wilfrid, 1993, St Wilfrid's, Preston, Lancashire
Lectern, 1995, St Cuthbert's, Durham City
Memorial Processional Cross, 1995, St Cuthbert's, Durham City
Stained Glass Sanctuary Screen, 1995, St Mary's, Jarrow, Tyne and Wear
Hidden Life, 1996, St Wilfrid's, Preston, Lancashire
Annunciation, 1991, St Francis of Assisi, Hull
Cross, 1991, St Francis of Assisi, Hull
St Augustin, 1997, St Augustine's, Darlington, Co. Durham
Derry Cross, 1998, County Londonderry, Northern Ireland
Stained Glass Screen, 1991, St Benedict's, Garforth, Yorkshire
Cuthbert's Journey or The Journey, 1999, from 2005 at St Mary's, Lindisfarne (first shown at The Red Box, Newcastle-upon-Tyne;
Beda Bede, 2001, Beda Pontifico Collegio, Rome
The Wheel Cross, 2001, Gospel Garden, Lindisfarne. Also Bronze Cast thereof at St Aidan's College, Durham

Burning Bush, 2003, Family Collection
Finial, 2005, St Luke's, Grimethorpe, Yorkshire
Mary, 2006, St Mary's College, Durham University
"Risen Christ", 2008 Grey College, Durham, Durham University
"The Journey" 2008 Bronze, Millennium Square, Durham City

External links

His website

English sculptors
English male sculptors
1932 births
Living people
People from South Moor